Jeffrey Paul Mass (June 29, 1940 – March 30, 2001) was an American academic, historian, author and Japanologist.  He was Yamato Ichihashi Professor of Japanese History at Stanford University.

Early life
Mass was born in New York City in 1940. He earned a bachelor's degree in history from Hamilton College in 1961, a master's degree in history from New York University in 1965, and he received his doctorate in history from Yale in 1971.

Career
Mass joined the Stanford University faculty in 1973.  He was made a full professor in 1981.

After 1987, he spent the late spring and summer of each year teaching at Oxford University.

During many years, his research was supported by a Fulbright Research Fellowship, a Mellon Fellowship and a Guggenheim Fellowship, and other grants.

Selected works
In an overview of writings by and about Mass, OCLC/WorldCat lists roughly 30+ works in 110+ publications in 3 languages and 5,000+ library holdings.
This list is not finished; you can help Wikipedia by adding to it.
 Warrior government in early medieval Japan: a study of the Kamakura Bakufu, shugo and jitō, 1974
 The Kamakura bakufu: a study in documents, 1976
 The development of Kamakura rule, 1180-1250: a history with documents, 1979
 Court and Bakufu in Japan: essays in Kamakura history, 1982
 The Bakufu in Japanese history, 1985
 Lordship and inheritance in Early Medieval Japan: a study of the Kamakura Soryō system, 1989
 Antiquity and anachronism in Japanese history, 1992
 The origins of Japan's medieval world: courtiers, clerics, warriors, and peasants in the fourteenth century, 1997
 Yoritomo and the founding of the first Bakufu: the origins of dual government in Japan, 1999

References

External links
  Jeffrey P. Mass, 1940-2001 at MeijiGakuin.ac.jp

1940 births
2001 deaths
20th-century American historians
American male non-fiction writers
American Japanologists
Historians of Japan
Stanford University Department of History faculty
20th-century American male writers